Sphingopyxis granuli is a bacterium. It is a Gram-negative, non-spore-forming, rod-shaped bacterium. Its type strain is Kw07T (= KCTC 12209T = NBRC 100800T).

References

External links 
LPSN

Type strain of Sphingopyxis granuli at BacDive -  the Bacterial Diversity Metadatabase

Sphingomonadales
Bacteria described in 2011